Anupria Goenka (born 29 May 1987) is an Indian actress and model who appears in Hindi and Telugu films. She first shot to fame in 2013 as the face of UPA government's Bharat Nirman. Goenka made her on-screen debut with the 2013 Telugu film Potugadu, having previously starred in the 2013 short film Worth the Kiss. She made her Bollywood debut with Bobby Jasoos.

She subsequently starred in the comedy-drama Bobby Jasoos (2014), the drama Paathshala (2014), the action comedy Dishoom (2016) and the crime-drama Daddy (2017). Goenka went on to star in the action-thrillers Tiger Zinda Hai (2017) and War (2019), and the epic period drama Padmaavat (2018).

She made her web debut with Stories by Rabindranath Tagore and went onto appear in successful series like Sacred Games, Abhay, Criminal Justice, Asur: Welcome to Your Dark Side, Aashram and Criminal Justice: Behind Closed Doors.

Early life
Anupriya Goenka was born in a Marwadi Family on 29 May 1987 in Kanpur, Uttar Pradesh to Ravindra Kumar Goenka, a garment entrepreneur and Pushpa Goenka, a homemaker.

Goenka provided financial support to her family before she completed school. She said, "I was the enterprising one and started helping my father in the garment export business. Acting was always a hobby till I realized I couldn't do justice to both theatre and my corporate career," she said.

Career
Goenka moved to Mumbai in 2009. Goenka was intrigued with theater and tried to juggle between a career in acting and the corporate sector. She started doing commercials and first became known in 2013 as the face of UPA government's Bharat Nirman ad campaign and for playing a lesbian character in India's first ever lesbian ad for the brand Myntra in 2015. Goenka has appeared in various television commercials for brands including Coke, Garnier, Stayfree, Kotak Mahindra Bank, Pepperfry, and Vodafone. She also worked as an Anchor / Show Host in a Home Shopping Channel called ShopCJ for more than one year. She portrayed the role of nurse Poorna in the 2017 action-thriller Tiger Zinda Hai. She garnered critical acclaim for the portrayal of the role of Queen Nagmati in the 2018 epic film Padmaavat opposite Shahid Kapoor.

Media 
Goenka was ranked in The Times Most Desirable Women at No. 8 in 2020.

Filmography

Notes

References

External links

 
 

Indian television actresses
Indian film actresses
21st-century Indian actresses
Actresses from Lucknow
Living people
People from Kanpur
1979 births